Gary Danko is an American chef. He combines French, Mediterranean, and American styles into his cooking. He is best known for his eponymous restaurant in San Francisco, California.

Early life
Danko was born in Massena, New York, his father was a Hungarian immigrant. His grandmother was Jewish and he grew up with Hungarian cooking with Jewish overtones.

Culinary development

Danko started cooking at the local Village Inn restaurant at age 14. By the time he graduated high school, he had been exposed to every position in the restaurant. Danko completed his culinary education at the Hyde Park, New York campus of the Culinary Institute of America. He relocated to San Francisco in 1977 and worked as a waiter at the Waterfront Restaurant. Chef Danko returned to New York to enroll in Madeleine Kamman's class at Peter Kump's New York Cooking School in 1983. In 1985, Danko became the executive chef at Beringer Vineyards. He later became the executive chef at Chateau Souverain in Sonoma County. In 1992 Danko left to become the chef of the Terrace restaurant at the Ritz Carlton, San Francisco. He was then appointed the executive chef of the Dining Room at the Ritz Carlton, S.F.Ritz-Carlton. Gary opened his eponymous restaurant in 1999, and has won numerous awards, including a Michelin star first awarded in 2007.

Restaurants

In 1999, Danko created his own restaurant, named for himself, near Fisherman's Wharf. Gary Danko has also made appearances as the featured chef on the Food Network and PBS. Restaurant Gary Danko has been a recipient of the Wine Spectator Grand Award since 2001. In 2002, the restaurant was designated one of 18 Relais & Chateaux properties in North America.

Food

Diners select from three, four or five prix-fixe menu courses. Danko's signature dishes include roast Maine lobster with white corn, tarragon, and chanterelles, pancetta wrapped frog legs with garlic purée, and roasted quail stuffed with mushrooms and foie gras. Most dishes are served year round, but ingredients are adjusted seasonally to emphasize local produce. Before it was banned in California, in late spring 2012, Danko's seared foie gras was paired with Bing cherries, but in early fall, with roast figs. It was returned to the menu recently, and now comes as Salt Cured Foie Gras Torchon with Pear Compote, Spiced Walnuts and Country Bread.

Awards and honors

References

External links
 AskMen America's Top Five Chefs
 Restaurant Gary Danko
 Michelin Guide
 James Beard Foundation

American chefs
American male chefs
Cuisine of the San Francisco Bay Area
American people of Hungarian-Jewish descent
People from Massena, New York
Living people
Businesspeople from the San Francisco Bay Area
Head chefs of Michelin starred restaurants
Culinary Institute of America Hyde Park alumni
James Beard Foundation Award winners
Year of birth missing (living people)
Chefs from San Francisco